The men's coxed four event was a rowing event conducted as part of the Rowing at the 1964 Summer Olympics programme. It was held from 11 to 15 October. There were 16 boats (80 competitors) from 16 nations, with each nation limited to a single boat in the event. The event was won by the United Team of Germany, the nation's second consecutive victory in the men's coxed four (though with an entirely new crew from 1960). The two medals placed the United Team of Germany in a tie for second-most all-time with Switzerland and Italy; Germany had the most with four. Italy earned its third straight medal in the event, all of different colours, with a silver in Tokyo (also with an entirely different crew in 1964 than 1960). The bronze medal went to the Netherlands, the nation's first medal in the event since 1900.

Background

This was the 12th appearance of the event. Rowing had been on the programme in 1896 but was cancelled due to bad weather. The coxed four was one of the four initial events introduced in 1900. It was not held in 1904 or 1908, but was held at every Games from 1912 to 1992 when it (along with the men's coxed pair) was replaced with the men's lightweight double sculls and men's lightweight coxless four.

The United Team of Germany had won the 1960 Olympics and West Germany had won the 1961 European championships, the 1962 World Championship, and the 1963 European championships; the West German crew (the same five who won the 1963 European title) that competed for the United Team here was heavily favoured. However, they had been beaten two months before the Olympics at the 1964 European championships by the Soviet Union, which sent the same team to Tokyo.

For the second time in three Games, no nations made their debut in the event. The United States made its 10th appearance, most among nations to that point.

Competition format

The coxed four event featured five-person boats, with four rowers and a coxswain. It was a sweep rowing event, with the rowers each having one oar (and thus each rowing on one side). The competition used the 2000 metres distance that became standard at the 1912 Olympics and which has been used ever since except at the 1948 Games.

The 1964 tournament introduced the "B" final, a consolation final that ranked rowers that had not qualified for the main, or "A", final. Six boats had become a standard final size in 1960 and continued here. This rowing competition consisted of two main rounds (semifinals and finals), as well as a repechage round that allowed teams that did not win their heats to advance to the semifinals.

 Semifinals: Three heats, 5 or 6 boats per heat. The winner of each heat (3 boats total) advanced directly to Final A; the remaining boats (13 total) went to the repechage.
 Repechage: Three heats, 4 or 5 boats per heat. The winner of each heat (3 boats) advanced to Final A; second- and third-place boats in each heat (6 boats) went to Final B; other boats (4 total) were eliminated.
 Finals: Two finals. Final A awarded the medals and 4th through 6th places; Final B was a consolation final for 7th through 12th place.

Schedule

All times are Japan Standard Time (UTC+9)

Results

Semifinals

The top crew in each heat advanced to the "A" final, with all others were sent to the repechages.

Semifinal 1

Semifinal 2

Semifinal 3

Repechage

The top finisher in each of the three repechage heats joined the "A" finalists. The second and third-place finishers competed in a consolation final for 7th to 12th places. All other crews were eliminated.

Repechage heat 1

Repechage heat 2

Repechage heat 3

Finals

Final B

The consolation final determined places from 7th to 12th.

Final A

References

Sources
 

Rowing at the 1964 Summer Olympics